Bazaria sieversi is a species of snout moth in the genus Bazaria. It was described by Hugo Theodor Christoph in 1877 and is known from Turkmenistan

References

Phycitini
Moths described in 1877
Moths of Asia